, also known as , is a Japanese light novel series written by Tōka Takei, with illustrations by Cuteg. Kodansha has published 16 volumes from December 2011 to September 2016. A manga adaptation and two spin-off series have been serialized in Kodansha's magazines. An anime adaptation produced by Hoods Entertainment aired in Japan from April to June 2014, and is licensed in North America by NIS America.

Plot
Souta Hatate, a new transfer student to the Hatagaya School, has the ability to see the futures of those around him in the form of flags. He is able to affect those flags based on his interactions with the person in question. He ends up living in a small dorm with many beautiful girls. When he finds a flag of death on himself, Souta learns that in order to be able to change his fate, he has to find and bring together four people: a princess knight, a magician, a cleric, and a shinobi.

Characters

Souta is a transfer student to Hatagaya School who has the ability to see the fate of the people around him in the form of flags atop their heads. He can "break" the flags depending on his actions and thus change the fate of the people around him. Several weeks prior to the start of the series, he was the sole survivor of the  a cruise ship that sank. There, he acquired the ability to see and alter flags from Sakura, who played a chess-like game with him during the cruise. In the anime, he seeks his sister who was also aboard the Premium Ambriel; the sister is later revealed to be Nanami. He is a Bladefield family member, Nanami's younger brother and Hakua's older brother, thus revealing his name to be Souta Bladefield.

The thirteenth princess of Bladefield, a small principality in Europe. When she introduces herself to Souta, she does not raise a flag like the other characters. She shows an interest in his ability, and serves as the "princess knight" in his party. In the anime, she is revealed to be Souta's older sister, and the daughter of Elia Bladefield.

Akane is the granddaughter to the founder of the renowned Mahougasawa Foundation. She sports a friendship flag that reappears no matter how many times Souta tries to break it, and becomes the "magician" in Souta's party. When she was younger, she was separated from her very first friend by her caretakers, who said that the difference in their classes was pitiable. As a result, she tries to "save" Souta and atone for her broken friendship. She is the first among the Quest Dorm housemates to raise a death flag, which Souta converts into a "route conquered" love flag by kissing her. Afterwards, she falls in love with Souta. In the anime, Akane's death flag incident occurs before any of the girls have moved in with Souta.

Kikuno, nicknamed Okiku by Souta, is a childhood friend who likes to act as an older sister to him and does not relent in doing so for anything, as demonstrated by her "sibling love" flag that dodges Souta's flag-breaking attempts. She represents the "summoner" from the fairy tale.

Megumu is a schoolmate whom everyone thinks is a girl despite his dressing in the male school uniform. Because Souta recognizes Megumu as a boy, he immediately likes him, and sprouts a string of friendship flags near him. The schoolmates' ignorance of his gender (and presence) becomes a running gag in the anime with only a couple of times where they get his gender right. He is the "thief" in Souta's party.

Rin is a member of the archery club who transfers to Quest Dorm at the request of the student council president to help them win the athletic tournament. Souta notes that she has a "hates men" flag on their first meeting. She is friends with Kikuno and reveals that she had a male childhood friend named Souda whom she regards as her best friend, and who is the only male in the world whom she likes. Even though he moved away several years previously, she keeps in touch with him by text. When she discovers that Souta is her childhood friend, she retreats in embarrassment and reveals a yandere flag which Souta manages to change into a "conquest completed" flag, much to his dismay,  although the yandere flag sometimes reappears.

Ruri is an android created by the Mahougasawa Foundation. She serves as the "shinobi" in Souta's party, and is introduced in the story as a secret weapon to help the Quest Dorm in the school's athletic tournament games. She frequently asks yes–no questions regarding actions she is about to perform, and is programmed to act like a little sister to Souta.

An idol who performs at the school festival and later transfers to Hatagaya, where she moves into the Quest Dorm. Her role in the group is the "bard". Souta and Nanami learn that Souta met Serika previously and that she was able to become an idol because Souta told her that she had a "Success Flag". She did not know the name of the person who said that and thought of him only as "Purple Flagman". She later discovers Souta is that person and develops feelings for him, calling him Hatate-sama.

The student council president, and the granddaughter of the school chairman. Although she was responsible for placing Souta in the remote and rundown Quest Dorm, she atones by having the building renovated by the school's engineering club. The school board wants to shut Quest Dorm down, but she arranges for its continued operation provided the tenants win the MVP at the upcoming sports festival. Later, she starts calling Souta by his first name, "Souta-kun", instead of "Hatate Souta".

Tsumugi is a schoolmate who is rumored to have been with the school before it was built. The rumors persist to the point that her peers call her "baba-sama" (elderly woman). She appears as a young girl wearing a bonnet and acts like a grandmother towards Souta.

Mei is a mysterious girl who knows about Souta's powers and his connection to her world. Her title is number 7 of the House of Shigitoku. She shows Souta the "virtual world", which is an artificially created world. After Souta and Mei get back from the virtual world, she sees Souta sleeping and tries to get him rid of the "Death Flag" he has on his head. Then, "the Sacraments" or "Sakura" appears and disposes of her memories and also her ability to see flags. She serves as the party's "samurai".

Kurumiko is a middle school girl who is introduced as a popsicle vendor during the school trip to the beach. Her parents were part of the crew of the Premium Ambriel therefore she recognizes Souta and feels guilty for the treatment he was subjected to after the incident, more so even than her losing her parents in the accident. When she shows Souta a seaside cave and they become trapped by the rising tide, Kurumiko loses hope and a death flag appears. Souta saves her by agreeing to think of her as his little sister and then offering to get her into Hatagaya middle school while having her live with him at Quest Dorm. She becomes the "cleric" in Souta's party, and her flags are usually ones of story advancement. Kurumiko speaks very formally, even in casual situations.

Hakua is Nanami's younger sister and another princess of Bladefield. She is overly polite and, having been raised in the Bladefield royal family and living a life sheltered from the outside world, is clueless about the life of commoners. She comes to Japan to study the life of commoners with her sister. In the anime, she is revealed to be the daughter of Elia Bladefield, whom she had thought to be her eldest brother, as well as Souta's younger half-sister. It is implied that she has a brother complex, even before she knew that Souta is her brother.

She is Souta's homeroom teacher and the resident adviser at Quest Dorm. When Mei shows Souta an alternate world, he meets an alternate version of Miyuki on the wreck of the Premium Ambriel where he motivates her to live on. She reveals that her great-grandfather's name was Souta Hatate, making her his descendant. Immediately after this he notes that she has a "main character" flag and is told that the alternate Miyuki will now play a major role in how events progress in that world.

Sakura is a mysterious girl whom Souta meets on the Premium Ambriel and who gives him his powers. After Mei and Souta visit the alternate world, she removes Mei's flag observing powers and related memories. She is nearly identical to, and shares the same voice actress with, Laplace's Demon. The two together were emotion programs designed to act as a conscience for Angel Boat, which cut them off when it rebelled. Laplace's Demon is focused mainly on the will of individuals, and bears a strong affinity to those with strong hearts and a powerful sense of sacrifice, while Sakura is instead focused on the bonds that tie people together.

Number 0 is an advisor of the Council of the Seven Virtues who appears in the anime series. She needs Souta in order to combat the Angelus Gemeni. She is revealed to be , the founding queen of Bladefield.

Media

Light novels
If Her Flag Breaks began as a light novel series written by Tōka Takei, with illustrations by Cuteg. The first volume was published on December 2, 2011 under Kodansha's Kodansha Ranobe Bunko. Kodansha has published 16 volumes.

Manga
A manga adaptation illustrated by Nagian began serialization in the December 2011 issue of Kodansha's Monthly Shōnen Rival magazine, published on November 4, 2011. It was serialized in the magazine until the April 2014 issue, published on February 26, 2014, and the manga was transferred to Monthly Shōnen Sirius, being published from the May 2014 issue, on March 25, 2014. The manga finished in the April 2015 issue of Monthly Shōnen Sirius, released on February 26, 2015. Kodansha compiled the series into ten tankōbon volumes, published from March 2, 2012 to April 2, 2015. A second series, titled , was serialized in Monthly Shōnen Sirius from April 25, 2015 to February 26, 2016. It was later transferred to Suiyōbi no Sirius website, where it ran from March 23 to June 22, 2016. Kodansha compiled its chapters into four tankōbon volumes, released from July 31, 2015 to September 2, 2016.

It was also published on Magazine Lab website. The series shows Souta and the girls as characters in a fantasy role-playing game world. Kodansha released a tankōbon volume on May 30, 2014.

Its chapters were compiled into two tankōbon volumes, published on April 2 and July 2, 2014.

Anime
An anime adaptation, produced by Hoods Entertainment and directed by Ayumu Watanabe, aired from April 6 to June 29, 2014 on Tokyo MX and later on Sun TV, TV Aichi, BS11 and AT-X. NIS America simulcasted the series on Crunchyroll with English subtitles.

Reception
Rebecca Silverman of Anime News Network wrote that the anime was a "fairly classic harem show," but that each episode throws something unexpected at the viewers to keep their attention. She criticized the overuse of pastel coloring, the female characters having either generic designs or annoying personality traits and felt the ending was rushed. Brittany Vincent of Japanator was immediately put off by the first episode which she described as boring, with "awful animation [and] bizarre clothing".

Notes

References
Light novels

 Vol. 1:  
 Vol. 2:  
 Vol. 3:  
 Vol. 4:  
 Vol. 5:  
 Vol. 6:  
 Vol. 7:  
 Vol. 8:  

Manga

 
 
 
 
 
 
 

 Anime

 EP 1:  "I'm Going to Marry Her, Once I Leave This School".
 EP 2:  "Girls are in the Dorm. But I can't say it yet. Wait until tomorrow.".
 EP 11:  "There's No Need To Dance With Everyone, I Am More Than Satisfied Dancing Here Alone".
 EP 12:  "What a Terrible World This Is. Let Me Take a Look Behind It Real Quick".

Other

External links
 at Kodansha 
 
Kanojo ga Flag o Oraretara at Crunchyroll

2011 Japanese novels
2011 manga
Anime and manga based on light novels
Harem anime and manga
Hoods Entertainment
Kodansha manga
Kodansha Ranobe Bunko
Light novels
Medialink
Romantic comedy anime and manga
Shōnen manga
Television shows based on light novels